Pierino Gabetti (22 May 1904 – 28 February 1971) was an Italian weightlifter who competed in the 1924 Summer Olympics, in the 1928 Summer Olympics, and in the 1932 Summer Olympics.

Biography
He was born in Sestri Ponente. Gabetti won a gold medal in the featherweight class in 1924 as well as a silver medal in the featherweight class in 1928. In the 1932 Summer Olympics he finished fourth in the lightweight class.

References

External links
 

1904 births
1971 deaths
Italian male weightlifters
Olympic weightlifters of Italy
Weightlifters at the 1924 Summer Olympics
Weightlifters at the 1928 Summer Olympics
Weightlifters at the 1932 Summer Olympics
Olympic gold medalists for Italy
Olympic silver medalists for Italy
World record setters in weightlifting
Olympic medalists in weightlifting
Medalists at the 1928 Summer Olympics
Medalists at the 1924 Summer Olympics
20th-century Italian people